Soleyman Rural District is a rural district (dehestan) in Soleyman District, Zaveh County, Razavi Khorasan Province, Iran. At the 2006 census, its population was 27,332, in 6,261 families.  The rural district has 27 villages.

References 

Rural Districts of Razavi Khorasan Province
Zaveh County